A K Khan & Co. Ltd. is one of the oldest Bangladeshi conglomerates headquartered in Chittagong. It was established in 1945 by Abul Kashem Khan during the Second World War.

Projects
The company is planning to setup a tyre plant under joint collaboration with Indian company CEAT. The company is also building a private sector Special Economic Zone in Narsingdi. It is one of the largest conglomerates present in Bangladesh.

References

External links 

Conglomerate companies established in 1945
Conglomerate companies of Bangladesh
Companies based in Chittagong
1945 establishments in India